Kennedy Sylvester Isles (25 January 1991 – 24 January 2020) was a Saint Kitts and Nevis footballer who played as a midfielder. He played for Newtown United in the SKNFA Super League and the Saint Kitts and Nevis national football team. Isles, who was shot in Newtown, Basseterre, died of gunshot wounds on 24 January 2020, one day shy of his 29th birthday.

Club career
Born in Basseterre, Isles began his career with Newtown United. In 2013, he signed for TT Pro League side St. Ann's Rangers from local Saint Kitts and Nevis side Newtown United. In 2015 he moved to Morvant Caledonia United.

International career
He made his debut for the Saint Kitts and Nevis national football team on 3 September 2014 in a 0-0 draw against Saint Lucia.

International goals
Scores and results list Saint Kitts and Nevis' goal tally first.

References 

1991 births
2020 deaths
Saint Kitts and Nevis footballers
Saint Kitts and Nevis expatriate footballers
Association football midfielders
Expatriate footballers in Trinidad and Tobago
People from Basseterre
Saint Kitts and Nevis international footballers
TT Pro League players
Male murder victims
People murdered in Saint Kitts and Nevis
Saint Kitts and Nevis murder victims
Deaths by firearm in Saint Kitts and Nevis
Saint Kitts and Nevis under-20 international footballers
Saint Kitts and Nevis youth international footballers